Vera Brookman (1908 – 14 December 1964) was a British painter. Her work was part of the painting event in the art competition at the 1948 Summer Olympics.

References

1908 births
1964 deaths
20th-century British painters
British women painters
Olympic competitors in art competitions
Artists from Portsmouth